Lance Sydney Mountain (born 7 September 1940) is a former cricketer who played first-class cricket for Northern Districts in New Zealand from 1967 to 1974.

Born at Kawakawa in Northland, Lance Mountain was Northern Districts' wicket-keeper for seven seasons. His only first-class match for another team was for North Island in 1970–71.

He also played Hawke Cup cricket for Northland from 1959 to 1978. The annual award for the best wicket-keeper in Northland club cricket is the Lance Mountain Trophy.

References

External links

1940 births
Living people
New Zealand cricketers
Northern Districts cricketers
People from Kawakawa, New Zealand
North Island cricketers